Captain Munir Redfa, born Munir Habib Jamil Rufa (‎) (1934 –  1998) was an Iraqi fighter pilot.
After Qasim's coup, Redfa was one of only five pilots the new regime trusted to continue serving with the sole Iraqi unit operating the Mikoyan-Gurevich MiG-21, 11th Squadron.

Redfa defected in 1966 in "Operation Diamond", flying a MiG-21 of the Iraqi Air Force to Israel. In what is considered one of the Mossad's most successful operations, Redfa's entire extended family was smuggled safely out of Iraq to Israel. The MiG-21 fighter was evaluated by the Israeli Air Force and was later loaned to the United States for testing and intelligence analysis, as part of "Have Doughnut". Knowledge obtained from analysis of the aircraft was instrumental to the successes achieved by the Israeli Air Force in its future encounters with Arab MiG-21s. Redfa's defection was the subject of the movie Steal the Sky (1988).

Redfa was an Assyrian, adherent of the Chaldean Catholic Church.

Redfa died of a heart attack around 1998.

See also
 Viktor Belenko
 List of Cold War pilot defections

References

External links
 Stealing a Soviet MiG, Jewish Virtual Library.

Iraqi Assyrian people
People from Mosul
Iraqi emigrants to Israel
Iraqi Air Force officers
Mossad
Iraqi Oriental Orthodox Christians
Iraqi defectors
Israeli Oriental Orthodox Christians
Israeli people of Iraqi descent
1934 births

1990s deaths